Vyacheslav Oleksandrovych Serdyuk (born 28 January 1985) is a Ukrainian former football defender.

External links
 Profile at FFU website
 
 

1985 births
Living people
People from Shostka
Ukrainian footballers
Association football defenders
Ukrainian expatriate footballers
Expatriate footballers in Russia
Expatriate footballers in Belarus
Ukrainian Premier League players
FC Moscow players
FC Dnipro players
FC Naftovyk-Ukrnafta Okhtyrka players
FC Kryvbas Kryvyi Rih players
FC Arsenal Kyiv players
FC Gomel players
FC Torpedo-BelAZ Zhodino players
Sportspeople from Sumy Oblast